William Baziotes (June 11, 1912 – June 6, 1963) was an American painter influenced by Surrealism and was a contributor to Abstract Expressionism.

Life and career

Born and raised in Pittsburgh, Pennsylvania to Greek parents Angelos and Stella, Baziotes began his formal art training in 1933 at the National Academy of Design in New York City where he graduated in 1936. He studied with Charles Curran, Ivan Olinsky, Gifford Beal, and Leon Kroll. Baziotes taught through the Federal Art Project in from 1936-1938 and worked on their WPA Easel Project from 1938–1940.

In the 1940s he became friends with many artists in the emerging Abstract Expressionist group. Although he shared the groups' interest in primitive art and automatism, his work was more in line with European surrealism. Later in his career he taught extensively. His first solo exhibition was at Peggy Guggenheim's Art of This Century Gallery in 1944.

In 1948, Baziotes, Mark Rothko, Robert Motherwell, Barnett Newman and David Hare founded the Subjects of the Artist School at 35 East 8th Street. Well attended lectures there were open to the public, with speakers such as Jean Arp, John Cage and Ad Reinhardt, but the art school failed financially and closed in the spring of 1949. He later taught at the Brooklyn Museum Art School, People's Art Center, the Museum of Modern Art, and at the City University of New York, Hunter College and New York University in Manhattan during the last ten years of his life.

Baziotes and his wife Ethel, whom he married in 1941, lived in the Morningside Heights area of northern Manhattan until his death from lung cancer in June 1963, five days before his 51st birthday. During his lifetime, he and his wife shared a love of ancient Greek art and sculpture as well as the poetry of Charles Baudelaire. Many of his paintings are inspired by the latter's poetry as well as by ancient art.

Some of his famous works are Aquatic, Dusk, and The Room, all of which are in the Guggenheim Museum in New York.

Notable awards
Art Institute of Chicago

Notable exhibitions
William Baziotes, Paintings and Drawings, 1934–1962. Guggenheim Collection Venice, 2003–2004. Curated by Michael Preble, editor, William Baziotes Catalogue Raisonne.
William Baziotes, A Retrospective. Newport Harbor Art Museum/Orange County Museum of Art. 1978. Curated by Michael Preble.

Notable collections
Guggenheim Museum
Metropolitan Museum of Art
Museum of Modern Art
Smithsonian American Art Museum
Whitney Museum of American Art
Reading Public Museum

Notes

References
Michael Preble 2005: William Baziotes. Skira Publishing.
Mona Hadler:2013  "Baziotes, Surrealism, and Boxing: 'Life in a Squared Ring,'" The Space Between: Literature and Culture, 1914–1945, IX,1 (December, 2013), pp. 119–138

External links

 Biography and works by Baziotes at the Smithsonian American Art Museum
 Sketchbooks of William Baziotes, ca. 1933 from the Smithsonian Archives of American Art
 William Baziotes Biography, Hollis Taggart Galleries
 Biography and works by Baziotes at the Smithsonian American Art Museum

1912 births
1963 deaths
Abstract expressionist artists
American people of Greek descent
Hunter College faculty
New York University faculty
Modern painters
Artists from New York (state)
American surrealist artists
20th-century American painters
American male painters
Federal Art Project artists
Artists from Pittsburgh
Brooklyn Museum Art School faculty
20th-century American male artists